Natana Kasinthan is an Indian historian, archaeologist, author and epigraphist who is known for his work on inscriptions of Tamil Nadu. He served as the Director of the Tamil Nadu Archaeology Department, Government of Tamil Nadu. He is credited for reviving the inscriptions relating to early Tamil civilizations.

Discoveries 
Rock Art at Mallachandram.

Journals 
Date of Early Tamil Epigraphs

Kumarikkandam and Harappan Civilization

The Unknown Sanskrit Poets of Pallava, Pandya, Chola Periods

The Role of Shepherds Through The Ages

Kala : The journal of Indian Art History Congress 5 (1998–1999)

Kalvettu, Journal of Tamil Nadu State Department of Archeology

Books 
Ancient Industries of Tamil Nadu

Thamizhar Panpattu Sitharalgal

Vanniyar Varalaru II (History of Vanniyars Volume II)

Thamizhar Kasu Iyal

Hero Stones in Tamilnadu

Tamils Heritage

Thonmai Thamizhum Thonmai Thamizharurum

Samana Thadayam

Muthil Mugizhdha Mutharaiyar

References 

20th-century Indian archaeologists
Living people
Cultural historians
Indian epigraphers
20th-century Indian linguists
Tamil history
20th-century Indian historians
Indian art historians
Scientists from Tamil Nadu
Tamil-language writers
Year of birth missing (living people)